Naagu is a 1984 Tollywood film directed by Tatineni Prasad and produced by AVM Productions. This film stars Chiranjeevi, Radha and Jaggayya.

Plot 
Naagu (Chiranjeevi) is a small-time criminal by profession. He has Rajani (Radha) as his love interest. One day, Rajani falls from the top floor of a hotel and dies. Her death is suspected as murder and suspicion falls on Naagu. Naagu's mother later reveals that Naagu's father was killed by a person called Jagapati Rao ( Kongara Jaggayya) and Rajani's murder was also committed by him. Now, its Naagu's turn to prove his innocence by gaining evidence against Jagapati Rao and bring him to justice. How Naagu succeeds in his mission forms the climax of this movie.

Cast 
 Chiranjeevi as Naagu
 Radha as Raji
Satyanarayana as Parvathalu 
Jaggayya as Jagapati Rao 
Haranath as Soori 
Annapurna as Naagu's mother 
Mikkilineni

External links 

1984 films
1980s Telugu-language films
Films scored by K. Chakravarthy
Films directed by T. L. V. Prasad